Bas Sheva (July 25, 1925 – February 11, 1960), the stage name of Bernice Kanefsky, was an American singer, prominent in the 1950s. Although she began singing Jewish traditional and cantorial music, her career branched out into popular music.

Bas Sheva was born Bernice Kanefsky, to the family of Cantor Joseph Kanefsky of the Crotona Park North section of the Bronx on July 25, 1925. She studied voice with the intent of honoring her family's wishes that she become a cantor. Her voice was extremely powerful and had extraordinary dexterity. However, instead of cantorial music, she decided to move into popular music, adopting the stage name "Bas Sheva", the Ashkenazi pronunciation of the Biblical "Bathsheba".  Her career began in the Borscht Belt of New York's Catskill Mountains, performing for audiences of Jewish vacationers. Her recording career began around 1950 with a small number of obscure singles of standard hits, none of which sparked much commercial interest.

In 1953 Bas Sheva was engaged by bandleader Hal Mooney as the principal singer for the album "Soul of a People", a collection of traditional Jewish songs issued by Capitol Records. This disk sold well in the Jewish market, and Bas Sheva's performances of this familiar material contributed much to its success.

In 1954, Les Baxter, a composer and producer at Capitol Records, offered her the role of star vocalist on his suite "The Passions". Bas Sheva's performance on "The Passions" is startling even 50 years after it was recorded; she screams, wails, whimpers, howls, grunts, and even acts a little to the pulsating rhythms of Baxter's dark, gritty, and complex musical score. Even in an age where musical innovation was beginning to be encouraged, "The Passions" was far too innovative and edgy and the album was not a commercial success. Despite this showcase of the astounding range of her voice, Bas Sheva never recorded again.

Bas Sheva died on February 11, 1960, at the age of 34, as a result of a diabetic reaction suffered while entertaining on board a cruise ship off the coast of South Carolina.

External links
Cantorial performances by Bas Sheva

1925 births
1960 deaths
Women hazzans
Exotica
Jewish American musicians
Jewish women singers
Capitol Records artists
20th-century American singers
20th-century American women singers
20th-century American Jews
American Ashkenazi Jews
Deaths from diabetes
Pseudonyms